Hugh Wilson (1905 – 4 January 1998) was a politician in Northern Ireland.

Born in Ballyclare,  Wilson worked as a surgeon.  At the 1969 Northern Ireland general election, he stood as an independent Unionist supporter of the Prime Minister Terence O'Neill, taking 48% of the vote but being narrowly defeated by William Craig.

In the 1973 Northern Ireland local elections, Wilson was elected in Area "A" of Larne Borough Council, and held his seat in 1977 and 1981.

Wilson was elected in the 1973 Northern Ireland Assembly election in North Antrim, and held his seat on the Northern Ireland Constitutional Convention.  He stood unsuccessfully for the Westminster seat of North Antrim in February 1974 and 1979.  In the late 1970s, Wilson served as President of the Alliance Party.

References

1905 births
1998 deaths
Alliance Party of Northern Ireland politicians
Members of the Northern Ireland Assembly 1973–1974
Members of the Northern Ireland Constitutional Convention
People from Ballyclare
Members of Larne Borough Council